Elsa Goveia (12 April 1925 – 18 March 1980) was born in British Guiana and became a foremost scholar and historian of the Caribbean. She was the first woman to become a professor at the newly created University College of the West Indies (UCWI) and first professor of West Indian studies in the UCWI History Department. Her seminal work, Slave Society in the British Leeward Islands at the End of the Eighteenth Century (1965), was a pioneering study of the institution of slavery and the first to put forth the concept of a "slave society" encompassing not just the slaves but the entire community. She was one of the pioneers of historical research on slavery and the Caribbean and is considered the "premier social historian" from the 1960s to her death.

Early life
Elsa Vesta Goveia was born on 12 April 1925 in British Guiana to middle-class, ethnically mixed Portuguese and Afro-Guyanese family. One of two daughters, she was educated in a time when education was rare for even males in British Guiana. After winning a scholarship, she attended St. Joseph High School at the Convent of Mercy in Georgetown and graduated with her certificate. In 1944, she won the national British Guiana Scholarship and continued her education, studying history at University College London. She won the Pollard Prize for English history in 1947, becoming the first West Indian to win the scholarship, graduating with First Class Honors for her degree in 1948. Furthering her studies, Goveia attended the Institute of Historical Research in London under the tutelage of Eveline Martin until 1950, when she returned to the Caribbean and accepted a post at the newly created University College of the West Indies, as an assistant lecturer. Continuing her research during 1950 and 1951, Goveia prepared her thesis Slave Society in the British Leeward Islands 1780-1800, submitted it the following year and earned her PhD in 1952.

Career
Upon receipt of her degree, Goveia became a Lecturer and taught in the History Department of UCWI. Her courses focused on topics which had been elucidated in her doctoral thesis. Prior to Goveia, history of the Caribbean had focused on the economics of slavery and its political implications,  following a chronological sequence without regard to the larger context. Goveia, instead, analyzed the sociological impact of the slaves, free blacks, and other elements of society and how they functioned both as separate communities and as part of the whole. She recognized that the entire culture was built upon a "slave society" wherein relationships were defined not only by color but by maintaining a structure based upon superiority and inferiority; the interdependency of the group produced coherency in the society. She did not advocate remaining silent and shamed about past slavery, instead arguing that only by acknowledging and confronting the past could "human beings change what human beings made". At a time when historians mainly focused on the achievement and development the colonizers brought to the colonies, Goveia as an insider, approached history from the perspective of the colonized. It was an innovation to scholarship that forced scholars to consider the social history and a more interdisciplinary approach to analysis, questioning the historiography of the region.

Beginning in 1952 at the request of the Pan-American Institute of Geography and History, Goveia undertook a study that was to become one of her most important works, Study on the Historiography of the British West Indies. She researched and wrote parts of the project over a two-year period for the Pan-American Institute, which published it in 1956. In the years since its publication, the study has been called one of the two seminal works on historiography published in the 1960s; one of the most influential works; a serious contribution to scholarship; and a catalyst which caused other historians to "probe the inner dynamics of West Indian societies, economies, and polities…". She published other essays and analyses, such as "The West Indian Slave Laws of the Eighteenth Century", which appeared in a series published by UCWI called Chapters in West Indian History, which were perceptive and insightful.

In 1958, Goveia was made a Senior Lecturer and then in 1961 was appointed as a professor in West Indian History. The appointment was historic, as she simultaneously became the first (and only) female professor at UCWI, as well as the first Caribbean-born professor of West Indian History. In 1965, her thesis was published under the title of Slave Society in the British Leeward Islands at the End of the Eighteenth Century. Like her Study on Historiography the book became widely influential, being one of the first works to define the term "slave society" and its inner-workings. Rather than a "colonial society", which effectively left out slaves and free blacks, Goveia's focus was on the whole society and did not merely examine how slavery effected the state, but rather how the people involved were effected by the institution itself. Pointedly, she noted that rivalries between the various islands in the Caribbean were a result of the broader system, which simultaneously united and divided them. Because the "system" required that they support the hierarchy, individual islands communicated with their colonizers, rather than among themselves and competed for status rather than overall improvement of the citizenry.

From 1961, Goveia had health issues which curtailed her publishing output to an extent, but she continued teaching until her untimely death at age fifty-five.

Death and legacy
Goveia died at her home in Hope Mews Kingston, Saint Andrew Parish, Jamaica on 18 March 1980. 
In 1985, a lecture series named the Elsa Goveia Memorial Lectures was inaugurated and continues to highlight scholarship on the history of the Caribbean. In 1989, the reading room at the library on the Mona Campus of the University of the West Indies was renamed in Goveia's honor. 
Since 1995, the Association of Caribbean Historians has awarded the Elsa Goveia Prize to scholars who have exhibited excellence in the study of  Caribbean history.

References

Citations

Bibliography

 

 

 
 

 

1925 births
1980 deaths
Alumni of University College London
University of the West Indies academics
British Guiana people
Women educators
Women historians
20th-century women writers
Afro-Guyanese people
20th-century Guyanese historians
Guyanese expatriates in the United Kingdom
Guyanese expatriates in Jamaica